Sallys Flat is a locality in the Australian state of New South Wales.

The area now known as Sallys Flat is on the traditional land of the Wiradjuri people. 

Sallys Flat was a small gold-mining village established in 1872 at the same time as nearby Hill End boomed during the New South Wales gold rush. It produced gold for many years but was not a large producer. It is now a farming area.

In late 2015, Sallys Flat was one of six locations on an Australian Government shortlist for a nuclear waste repository. However the Government soon found the idea unpopular with locals and removed Sallys Flat from the list.

References

External links